pureNRG is the debut self-titled album from Christian pop group pureNRG, released on May 1, 2007 by Fervent Records, and features the songs "What If", "Live My Life For You" & "Pray". The album reached #12 in the Billboard Top Heatseekers chart, and #9 in the Billboard Top Kid Audio chart. They also covered "Thy Word" by Amy Grant and "Footloose" by Kenny Loggins.

Singles
"Footloose" (April 2007) Radio Disney
"Live My Life For You" (June 2007) Christian Pop Radio
"What If" (November 2007) Christian Pop Radio

Music videos
"Footloose" (pureNRG DVD)
"What If" (pureNRG DVD)

Track listing
"360"
"Live My Life for You"
"What If"
"Pray"
"When I Get to Heaven"
Thy Word" (Amy Grant cover)
"This Madness"
"Footloose" (Kenny Loggins cover)
"One Word"
"Someday"
"Summertime"
"It's Still Love"

Personnel
Melissa Cabezas Mattey – engineer, editing
Dave Dillbeck – engineer, editing
Robin Geary – grooming
Michael Gomez – photography
Mark Hammond – vocal producer
Aaron Kasdorf – engineer, Editing
Buckley Miller – assistant
Norman Miller – A&R
Brent Milligan – bass
Katherine Petillo – art direction
Susan Riley – executive producer, A&R
Ray Roper – design
Dan Shike- mastering
F. Reid Shipped – mixing

Chart performance
Billboard Top Heatseekers – #12 
Billboard Top Kid Audio – #9

References

2007 debut albums
Fervent Records albums
PureNRG albums